Masahiro Maehara is a Japanese former international table tennis player.

He won a silver medal at the 1977 World Table Tennis Championships in the Swaythling Cup (men's team event) with Tetsuo Inoue, Mitsuru Kono, Norio Takashima and Tokio Tasaka for Japan.

He then won two bronze medals at the 1979 World Table Tennis Championships and 1981 World Table Tennis Championships.

He was later the Director of the Japanese Table Tennis Association.

See also
 List of table tennis players
 List of World Table Tennis Championships medalists

References

Japanese male table tennis players
Living people
Asian Games medalists in table tennis
Table tennis players at the 1978 Asian Games
Medalists at the 1978 Asian Games
Asian Games silver medalists for Japan
World Table Tennis Championships medalists
Year of birth missing (living people)